Dark Round the Edges is the first album by British psychedelic rock group Dark, released in 1972. The original edition is considered to be a "holy grail" for record collectors.

Release
The album was originally released in an edition of 64 copies. Most copies were given away to family and close friends of the band, but some were sold. It is now considered to be one of the most valuable records, with original copies having been sold for prices upward to £6,000 and £25,000, depending on the version. In 2016, it was listed as the 17th most valuable record of all time by NME.

The album has been reissued several times.

Reception

Richie Unterberger of AllMusic commented that the songs were "largely vehicles for some involved, fuzzy hard rock guitar soloing" and compared the "softer parts" to Jefferson Airplane and The Grateful Dead.

Track listing

Personnel
Adapted from the back cover of Dark Around the Edges.

Dark
 Steve Giles – vocals, guitar, producer
 Martin Weaver – guitar
 Ronald Johnson – bass guitar
 Clive Thorneycroft – drums

Production and additional personnel 
 Alan Bowley – recording engineer
 Steve Giles – photography, design

Notes

References 

1972 albums
Psychedelic rock albums by English artists